Programming with Big Data in R (pbdR) is a series of R packages and an environment for statistical computing with big data by using high-performance statistical computation. The pbdR uses the same programming language as R with S3/S4 classes and methods which is used among statisticians and data miners for developing statistical software. The significant difference between pbdR and R code is that pbdR mainly focuses on distributed memory systems, where data are distributed across several processors and analyzed in a batch mode, while communications between processors are based on MPI that is easily used in large high-performance computing (HPC) systems. R system mainly focuses on single multi-core machines for data analysis via an interactive mode such as GUI interface.

Two main implementations in R using MPI are Rmpi and pbdMPI of pbdR.
 The pbdR built on pbdMPI uses SPMD parallelism where every processor is considered as worker and owns parts of data. The SPMD parallelism introduced in mid 1980 is particularly efficient in homogeneous computing environments for large data, for example, performing singular value decomposition on a large matrix, or performing clustering analysis on high-dimensional large data. On the other hand, there is no restriction to use manager/workers parallelism in SPMD parallelism environment.
 The Rmpi uses manager/workers parallelism where one main processor (manager) serves as the control of all other processors (workers). The manager/workers parallelism introduced around early 2000 is particularly efficient for large tasks in small clusters, for example, bootstrap method and Monte Carlo simulation in applied statistics since i.i.d. assumption is commonly used in most statistical analysis. In particular, task pull parallelism has better performance for Rmpi in heterogeneous computing environments.
The idea of SPMD parallelism is to let every processor do the same amount of work, but on different parts of a large data set. For example, a modern GPU is a large collection of slower co-processors that can simply apply the same computation on different parts of relatively smaller data, but the SPMD parallelism ends up with an efficient way to obtain final solutions (i.e. time to solution is shorter).

Package design 
Programming with pbdR requires usage of various packages developed by pbdR core team. Packages developed are the following.

Among these packages, pbdMPI provides wrapper functions to MPI library, and it also produces a shared library and a configuration file for MPI environments. All other packages rely on this configuration for installation and library loading that avoids difficulty of library linking and compiling. All other packages can directly use MPI functions easily.

 pbdMPI --- an efficient interface to MPI either OpenMPI or MPICH2 with a focus on Single Program/Multiple Data (SPMD) parallel programming style
 pbdSLAP --- bundles scalable dense linear algebra libraries in double precision for R, based on ScaLAPACK version 2.0.2 which includes several scalable linear algebra packages (namely BLACS, PBLAS, and ScaLAPACK).
 pbdNCDF4 --- interface to Parallel Unidata NetCDF4 format data files
 pbdBASE --- low-level ScaLAPACK codes and wrappers
 pbdDMAT --- distributed matrix classes and computational methods, with a focus on linear algebra and statistics
 pbdDEMO --- set of package demonstrations and examples, and this unifying vignette
 pmclust --- parallel model-based clustering using pbdR
 pbdPROF --- profiling package for MPI codes and visualization of parsed stats
 pbdZMQ --- interface to ØMQ
 remoter --- R client with remote R servers
 pbdCS --- pbdR client with remote pbdR servers
 pbdRPC --- remote procedure call
 kazaam --- very tall and skinny distributed matrices
 pbdML --- machine learning toolbox

Among those packages, the pbdDEMO package is a collection of 20+ package demos which offer example uses of the various pbdR packages, and contains a vignette that offers detailed explanations for the demos and provides some mathematical or statistical insight.

Examples

Example 1 
Hello World! Save the following code in a file called "demo.r"
### Initial MPI
library(pbdMPI, quiet = TRUE)
init()

comm.cat("Hello World!\n")

### Finish
finalize()
and use the command
mpiexec -np 2 Rscript demo.r
to execute the code where Rscript is one of command line executable program.

Example 2 
The following example modified from pbdMPI illustrates the basic syntax of the language of pbdR.
Since pbdR is designed in SPMD, all the R scripts are stored in files and executed from the command line via mpiexec, mpirun, etc. Save the following code in a file called "demo.r"
### Initial MPI
library(pbdMPI, quiet = TRUE)
init()
.comm.size <- comm.size()
.comm.rank <- comm.rank()

### Set a vector x on all processors with different values
N <- 5
x <- (1:N) + N * .comm.rank

### All reduce x using summation operation
y <- allreduce(as.integer(x), op = "sum")
comm.print(y)
y <- allreduce(as.double(x), op = "sum")
comm.print(y)

### Finish
finalize()
and use the command
mpiexec -np 4 Rscript demo.r
to execute the code where Rscript is one of command line executable program.

Example 3 
The following example modified from pbdDEMO illustrates the basic ddmatrix computation of pbdR which performs singular value decomposition on a given matrix.
Save the following code in a file called "demo.r"
# Initialize process grid
library(pbdDMAT, quiet=T)
if(comm.size() != 2)
  comm.stop("Exactly 2 processors are required for this demo.")
init.grid()

# Setup for the remainder
comm.set.seed(diff=TRUE)
M <- N <- 16
BL <- 2 # blocking --- passing single value BL assumes BLxBL blocking
dA <- ddmatrix("rnorm", nrow=M, ncol=N, mean=100, sd=10)

# LA SVD
svd1 <- La.svd(dA)
comm.print(svd1$d)

# Finish
finalize()
and use the command
mpiexec -np 2 Rscript demo.r
to execute the code where Rscript is one of command line executable program.

Further reading 
 
 
 
 
 This article was read 22,584 times in 2012 since it posted on October 16, 2012 and ranked number 3

References

External links 
 

Cross-platform free software
Data mining and machine learning software
Data-centric programming languages
Free statistical software
Functional languages
Numerical analysis software for Linux
Numerical analysis software for macOS
Numerical analysis software for Windows
Parallel computing